Stagecoach is an unincorporated community and census-designated place (CDP) in Lyon County, Nevada, United States, located east of Reno. Its name is likely derived from its place as the Overland Stagecoach station at Desert Well. Typically, the mail that was heading towards California was delivered on a steamship through Panama.  But in 1857, the Overland mail company was created, and the Desert Well station was a dual stop for both the stagecoach line and the Pony Express.

As of the 2010 census, the population of Stagecoach was 1,874.

Geography

Demographics

References

Census-designated places in Lyon County, Nevada
Census-designated places in Nevada
Pony Express stations
Stagecoach stops in the United States
1857 establishments in Utah Territory